Message in the Music is a 1976 album by American R&B group the O'Jays.

Released in 1976 on the Philadelphia International Records label.  Recorded at the Sigma Sound Studios in Philadelphia, with six of the eight tracks written and produced by Kenny Gamble and Leon Huff,  Message in the Music spawned two R&B chart-topping singles in "Message in Our Music" and "Darlin' Darlin' Baby (Sweet, Tender, Love)", with the latter also giving the group their fourth UK top 30 single.  Message in the Music peaked at #3 on the R&B chart (ending a run of three consecutive #1 R&B albums for the group) and reached #20 on the pop chart.

Message in the Music is the last O'Jays album to feature vocals from original group member William Powell, who would die prematurely from cancer, aged 35, in May 1977.

In 2004, Message in the Music was reissued by Demon Music in the UK in a double package with The O'Jays' 1977 album Travelin' at the Speed of Thought.

Track listing

Charts
Album

Singles

Certifications

References

External links
 Message in the Music at Discogs

1976 albums
The O'Jays albums
Albums produced by Kenneth Gamble
Albums produced by Leon Huff
Albums arranged by Bobby Martin
Albums recorded at Sigma Sound Studios
Philadelphia International Records albums